Jenny Morris is a British practitioner of environmental health and an advocate for food safety.  She is best known for her leadership promoting food safety during the 2012 Summer Olympics in London.

Jenny began her career as an Environmental Health Officer in Royal Borough Windsor and Maidenhead in 2000.  In 2014, she led the establishment of The Institute of Food Safety, Integrity, and Protection (TiFSiP) as part of the Chartered Institute of Environmental Health.

Morris received her Bachelor of Sciences in Environmental Health in 1997 from King's College London.  She received her Masters of Science in Food Safety in 2002 from the University of Birmingham, and in 2007 she received her Masters of Business Administration with a focus in Public Service from the same institution.

Morris is a Chartered Fellow of the CIEH, and a Fellow of the Royal Society for Public Health. In 2014, and she was invested as a Member of the Most Excellent Order of the British Empire.

References 

Year of birth missing (living people)
Living people
Alumni of King's College London
Alumni of the University of Birmingham
Environmental health practitioners
Members of the Order of the British Empire
Fellows of the Chartered Institute of Environmental Health
Fellows of the Royal Society for Public Health